Ephedra torreyana, with common names Torrey's jointfir or Torrey's Mormon tea, is a species of Ephedra that is native to the deserts and scrublands of the Southwestern United States (Nevada, Utah, Colorado, Arizona, New Mexico, Texas) and to the State of Chihuahua and northern Mexico.

It was originally described by Sereno Watson in 1879 and placed in section Alatae, "tribe" Habrolepides by Otto Stapf in 1889. In 1996 Robert A. Price left E. torreyana in section Alatae without recognizing a tribe.

Varieties
Ephedra torreyana var. powelliorum — Texas and Chihuahua 
Ephedra torreyana  var. torreyana - Southwestern United States

References

External links
USDA Plants Profile for Ephedra torreyana (Torrey's jointfir) 

torryana
North American desert flora
Flora of Chihuahua (state)
Flora of the Southwestern United States
Plants described in 1879